DCFS, the International Workshop on Descriptional Complexity of Formal Systems is an annual academic conference in the 
field of computer science.

Beginning with the 2011 edition, the proceedings of the workshop appear in the series Lecture Notes in Computer Science. Already since the very beginning, extended versions of selected papers are published as special issues of the International Journal of Foundations of Computer Science, the Journal of Automata, Languages and Combinatorics, of Theoretical Computer Science, and of Information and Computation In 2002 DCFS was the result of the merger of the workshops DCAGRS (Descriptional Complexity of Automata, Grammars and Related Structures) and FDSR (Formal Descriptions and Software Reliability). The workshop is often collocated with international conferences in related fields, such as ICALP, DLT and CIAA.

Topics of the workshop 
Typical topics include:
 various measures of descriptional complexity of automata, grammars, languages and of related systems
 trade-offs between descriptional complexity and mode of operation
 circuit complexity of Boolean functions and related measures
 succinctness of description of (finite) objects
 state complexity of finite automata
 descriptional complexity in resource-bounded or structure-bounded environments
 structural complexity
 descriptional complexity of formal systems for applications (e.g. software reliability, software and hardware testing, modelling of natural languages)
 descriptional complexity aspects of nature-motivated (bio-inspired) architectures and unconventional models of computing
 Kolmogorov–Chaitin complexity and descriptional complexity
As such, the topics of the conference overlap with those of the International Federation for Information Processing Working Group 1.2 on descriptional complexity.

Significance 
In a survey on descriptional complexity,  state that "since more than a decade the Workshop on 'Descriptional Complexity of Formal Systems' (DCFS), [...] has contributed substantially to the development of [its] field of research." In a talk on the occasion of the 10th anniversary of the workshop,  gave an overview about trends and directions in research papers presented at DCFS.

History of the workshop 

Chairs of the Steering Committee of the DCFS workshop series:

Basic information on each DCFS event, as well as on its precursors, DCAGRS and FSDR, is included in the following table.

See also 
 The list of computer science conferences contains other academic conferences in computer science.

References 
 Bianca Truthe: "Report on DCFS 2008." Bulletin of the EATCS 96:160-161, October 2008. Online edition accessed Feb 9, 2009.
  Talk held at the 11th DCFS in Magdeburg, Germany, July 6–9, 2009.
 Ian McQuillan: "Report on DCFS 2009." Bulletin of the EATCS 99:185-187, October 2009. Online edition accessed Nov 24, 2009.
 Electronic Proceedings in Theoretical Computer Science, official website.
 

 
 Andreas Malcher: "Report on DCFS 2012." Bulletin of the EATCS 108:168-169, October 2012. Online edition.

External links 
 Descriptional Complexity of Formal Systems: official website

Theoretical computer science conferences
Formal languages